Herman Marquis is a Jamaican saxophone musician who has played with many reggae artists including Burning Spear. He recorded for Arthur "Duke" Reid in the 1960s and was a member of The Revolutionaries and The Upsetters in the 1970s. He was much in demand as a session player throughout the 1970s and 1980s, playing with some of Jamaica's top stars including Gregory Isaacs, Dennis Brown, Bunny Wailer, and Justin Hinds. He continued through to the mid 1980s and worked with Burning Spear and Ernest Ranglin.

References

External links 
Herman Marquis at Roots Archives
Herman Marquis discography at CD Universe

Jamaican reggae musicians
Jamaican saxophonists
Male saxophonists
Living people
21st-century saxophonists
21st-century male musicians
Year of birth missing (living people)